Nico Onkenhout (1918-1989) was a Dutch sculptor who won a silver medal at  the 1947 Prix de Rome. Nico Onkenhout most famous sculpture is of Dik Trom.

Life and work 
Onkenhout studied sculpture with Jan Bronner at the National Academy of Fine Arts (1937-1944) in his hometown. He went into hiding during World War II, and went into hiding in 1944 in the municipality of Kollumerland c.a. After the war he made six war memorial and one of which for the municipality of Kollumerland. In 1947 he won the silver medal of the Prix de Rome. His most famous work, a bronze statue of Dik Trom, with Trom sitting upside down on a bucking donkey, he made in 1973.

Besides sculptor, Onkenhout was active as a medalist. He made a medal on the occasion of the opening of the head office of the insurance company De Zeven Provinciën in The Hague (1960). He was a member of Arti et Amicitiae and the Professional Association of Visual Artists.

References

1918 births
1989 deaths
Artists from Amsterdam
Dutch male sculptors
Dutch medallists